Dead Lovers' Sarabande (Face Two) is the fifth album by darkwave band Sopor Aeternus & the Ensemble of Shadows, and was released in 1999. It is the second of a two-album suite detailing the mourning of a lover who has recently passed. Like Face One, Face Two was also released in multiple formats, including a double vinyl edition and an A5-sized boxed set edition; both were limited pressings, of 500 and 3,000 copies, respectively.

Overview
Dead Lovers' Sarabande, as a whole, is a transitory death suite detailing the unnamed protagonist's mourning of her lover and her desire to rejoin him in the afterlife. Major recurring themes in the work include euthanasia, necrophilia, decay and loneliness. In (Face Two), the protagonist seems to have accepted the fact that her lover is dead and they will no longer share the same life they have led. She decides to continue loving him as she always have, despite his memory haunting her. She concludes by admitting that "it's easier to love the dead" and that she would truly be alone if Love was considered everything in life, rather than Death or Loneliness. Anna-Varney Cantodea later admitted that "Dead Lovers' Sarabande" was dedicated to, but not about, the late Rozz Williams, former frontman of deathrock band Christian Death.

The album retains the focus on folk music and chamber pieces presented by (Face One), but transplants many of the string instruments for brass arrangements. Electric guitar is featured on "If Loneliness was all", for the first time since "Todeswunsch - Sous le soleil de Saturne". The influence of drone music is still present on songs like "Procession/Funeral March". "Va(r)nitas, vanitas..." contains elements of "Feralia Genetalia" from "Voyager" - The Jugglers of Jusa. As a subtle joke, Cantodea referenced her own name in the song title, effectively translating it as "Varney, vanity... (...all is vanity)."

"Dead Lovers' Sarabande" (Face Two) was re-released on CD with newly packaged artwork in 2004.

Track listing

Personnel
 Katrin Ebert: Violin
 Martin Höfert: Cello
 Johannes Knirsch: Double bass
 Eric Santie-Laa: Cor anglais
 Doreena Gor: Bassoon
 Michael Schmeißer: Trumpet
 Carsten Weilnau: Trombone
 Eugene de la Fontaine: Tuba, oboe
 Thomas Langer: Guitars
 Anna-Varney Cantodea: Vocals, all other instruments and programming

References

Dead Lovers Sarabande Face Two
Dead Lovers Sarabande Face Two